The ice sledge hockey competition of the 2014 Winter Paralympics was held at the Shayba Arena in Sochi, Russia, from 8 to 15 March 2014. A total of eight teams competed in the mixed team tournament.

Medalists

Qualification

Preliminary round
All times are local (UTC+4).

Group A

Group B

Classification round

5–8th place semifinals

Seventh place game

Fifth place game

Medal round

Semifinals

Bronze medal game

Gold medal game

Final ranking

Statistics

Scoring leaders
List shows the top ten skaters sorted by points, then goals.

GP = Games played; G = Goals; A = Assists; Pts = Points; +/− = Plus/minus; PIM = Penalties in minutes; POS = Position

Leading goaltenders
Only the top five goaltenders, based on save percentage, who have played at least 40% of their team's minutes, are included in this list.
TOI = Time on ice (minutes:seconds); GA = Goals against; GAA = Goals against average; SA = Shots against; Sv% = Save percentage; SO = Shutouts

References

External links
Ice sledge hockey at the XI Paralympic Winter Games
Results book

 
2014 Winter Paralympics events
Paralympics, Winter
2014
International ice hockey competitions hosted by Russia